Oxysterol-binding protein-related protein 11 is a protein that in humans is encoded by the OSBPL11 gene.

Function 

This gene encodes a member of the oxysterol-binding protein (OSBP) family, a group of intracellular lipid receptors. Like most members, the encoded protein contains an N-terminal pleckstrin homology domain and a highly conserved C-terminal OSBP-like sterol-binding domain.

References

Further reading